B. V. Baliga was a Konkani activist and a writer as well as a poet. He is the founder editor of the famous Konkani Magazine 'Panchkadayi' (started in 1967). He served as the president of Karnataka Konkani Sahithya Academy. Honoured with tital 'Konkani Kalo' in First World Konkani Convention held in Mangalore.

References

2005 deaths
Year of birth missing
Writers from Mangalore
Mysore MLAs 1967–1972
Members of the Mysore Legislature